

A-Division clubs 

Armed Police Force Club
Brigade Boys Club
Chyasal Youth Club
Friends Club
Himalayan Sherpa Club
Jawalakhel Youth Club
Machhindra Football Club
Manang Marsyangdi Club
Nepal Police Club
New Road Team
Sankata Boys Sports Club
Satdobato Youth Club
Three Star Club
Tribhuvan Army Club
Khumaltar Youth Club

B-Division clubs 

 Bansbari Club
 Boys Union Club
 Jhamsikhel Youth Club
 Madhyapur Youth Association
 Nayabasti Youth Club
 Pulchowk Sports Club
 Ranipokhari Corner Team
 Saraswati Youth Club
 Shree Bhagwati Club
 Shree Kumari Club
 Tushal Youth Club

C-Division clubs 

 Birgunj Youth Academy Club
 Khalibari Youth Club
 Mahabir Youth Club
 Manohara United Youth Club
 Oasis Club
 Planning Boys United Club
 Social Welfare Sports Centre
 Samajik Youth Club
 Sanepa Club
 Sanogaucharan Youth Club
 Swoyambhu Club

After winning from 3 groups of "Martyr's Memorial 'C' Division League [Qualifying Tournament] (2019)" tournaments, Jhapa Football Club, Church Boys United and Birgunj United promoted to C-division on 06/19/2019

District clubs 

 Everest Club Chitwan
 Dharan Football Club
 Far Western Football Club
 Jhapa XI
 Lumbini Football Club
 Morang Football Club
 Sahara Club Pokhara

References 

Nepal
 
Football clubs
Football clubs